STKRJ Kampong Rimba or STKRJ Rimba is a public housing area on the northern outskirts of Bandar Seri Begawan, the capital of Brunei. It is officially a village subdivision under Mukim Gadong 'A', a mukim in Brunei-Muara District.

See also 
 Public housing in Brunei
 RPN Kampong Rimba

References 

Villages in Brunei-Muara District
Public housing estates in Brunei